Vittorio Colocci was an Italian racing driver. He entered 15 races between 1950 and 1956, including four times the Mille Miglia, mainly driving Ferraris and Lancias. His best results include one class victory and two second places.

Complete results

Resources
Information to be found in the resources beneath was used in both the introduction and the complete results table.
 Racing Sports Cars
 World Sports Racing Prototypes
 Formula 2 Register
 Mitorosso
 Barchetta...The Classic and Sports Car Portal
 classicscars.com
 J.M. Fangio – Un tributo al chueco...
 
 La Targa Florio
 Team DAN

Italian racing drivers